was a village located in Niihari District, Ibaraki Prefecture, Japan.

As of May 1, 2005, the village had an estimated population of 9,404 and a population density of 293.96 persons per km². The total area was 31.99 km².

On February 20, 2006, Niihari was merged into the expanded city of Tsuchiura.

External links
 Tsuchiura official website 

Dissolved municipalities of Ibaraki Prefecture